is a fighting video game developed by Electronics Application (Eleca) and published by Takara for the PlayStation game console released in Japan in October 2000. It features characters from various Tatsunoko superhero properties in addition to original creations developed exclusively for the game.  Each series is represented by characters, backgrounds, music, and voice actors from the original television programs, along with new art and animated sequences produced by Tatsunoko Production.

Plot 
In the future, a young scientist named Battering creates the "Salvasion System", a dimensional mobile device which allows for travel between parallel worlds. However, this device is stolen by the Demon King Dokucyber and his Jaleizer Empire to enact "Operation Dark Inferno", which sees Dokucyber, the Jaleizer Empire and all of the Tatsunoko villains from various worlds uniting to conquer the multiverse. To stop this, Battering created a combat strengthening suit to become Volter the Lightning and threw himself into the parallel worlds to unite with the Tatsunoko heroes and defeat Dokucyber and the Jaleizer Empire.

Gameplay 
Tatsunoko Fight is a two-dimensional, one-on-one fighting game where players must defeat their opponent in two of three rounds in order to advance.  The game relies on using both normal and special attacks in order to damage the opponent, with a round ending once all of a character's remaining vitality has been lost.  A special gauge at the bottom of the screen steadily fills when a character deals or receives damage, reaching a maximum of three levels.  Player's can then expend one level at a time to unleash a more powerful super attack on their opponent to deal more damage.  The game uses a combo system where light and heavy attacks can be chained together to launch a succession of attacks that cannot be interrupted or stopped until the sequence ends.  In addition to normal versus mode, players may choose a round-robin-style team battle mode involving multiple characters, as well as a single-player story mode that resembles an arcade fighting game.

Characters 

Tatsunoko Fight features playable characters from four established Tatsunoko franchises: Science Ninja Team Gatchaman, Neo-Human Casshern, Tekkaman: The Space Knight, and Hurricane Polymar, as well an original series created exclusively for the game, Denkou Senka Volter (電光石火ヴォルター, literally "Lightning Warrior Volter").  Each series is represented by three members, consisting of a "Hero", "Supporter", and "Arch Rival" character from their respective titles.  Original characters created solely for the game include the superhero Volter, his companion Neon, and their nemesis Karochi Taiki, as well as the game's primary antagonist, the demonic Rosraisen.  Many of the game's characters are voiced by the actors who portrayed them in their original animated appearances, with additional supporting characters making cameo appearances throughout gameplay.

See also
Tatsunoko vs. Capcom: Ultimate All-Stars

References

External links
Tatsunoko Fight at UK GameSpot

2000 video games
Japan-exclusive video games
PlayStation (console) games
PlayStation (console)-only games
Takara video games
Tatsunoko Production
Crossover fighting games
Video games based on anime and manga
Video games developed in Japan
Multiplayer and single-player video games